The Rau/Strong House is a historic house and accompanying carriage barn in Saint Paul, Minnesota, United States.  It is located in Saint Paul's West Side neighborhood. It was built 1884–86, with an eclectic Italianate/Second Empire/Eastlake movement design featuring a mansard roof and hammered quoin blocks.  The Rau/Strong House was listed on the National Register of Historic Places in 1975 for its architectural significance as a finely crafted "urban estate" representative of Saint Paul's late-19th-century middle class residences.

References

External links

Houses completed in 1886
Houses in Saint Paul, Minnesota
Houses on the National Register of Historic Places in Minnesota
National Register of Historic Places in Saint Paul, Minnesota
Second Empire architecture in Minnesota
Italianate architecture in Minnesota